Ruhr is the name of a département of the Grand Duchy of Berg, a satellite state of the First French Empire, in present day Germany. It was named after the river Ruhr, which flows through the département.

The capital was Dortmund.

References

Further reading 
 Charles Schmidt: Das Großherzogtum Berg, 1806–1813. Eine Studie zur französischen Vorherrschaft in Deutschland unter Napoleon I., Neustadt/Aisch 1999 [Dt. Übersetzung u. Nachdruck der Ausgabe Paris 1905], 
 Helmut Richtering (Hrsg.): Das Ruhrdepartement im Jahr 1809. Ein Reisebericht des Präfekten von Romberg, in: Beiträge zur Geschichte Dortmunds und der Grafschaft Mark 55 (1958), S. 65–108

Former departments of France in Germany
Dortmund
Former states and territories of North Rhine-Westphalia